The Catria Horse is a breed of horse originating in the mountainous area of the massif of Monte Catria in the Marche region of Italy, and surrounding areas in the provinces of Ancona, Perugia and Pesaro. It is one of the fifteen indigenous horse "breeds of limited distribution" recognised by the AIA, the Italian breeders' association.

History

The Catria horse derives from the cross-breeding of Maremmano-derived stock from west of the Apennines, thought to have been brought from their homeland in Tuscany mainly by charcoal burners, with other breeds, principally Franches-Montagnes. After the Second World War, the number of Catria horses decreased. The population survived in mountainous areas suitable only for untended livestock. In 1974, the Azienda Speciale Consortile del Catria, or "special co-operative agency of Catria", took control of horse breeding in the area.  In 1980, a herd book was opened to conserve the bloodlines of the breed.

Catria horses are used in the mountains for agricultural purposes, particularly for carrying cut firewood from steep woodland. They are also used for riding and for the production of horsemeat.

Characteristics
Catria Horses may only be bay or chestnut; breeding stallions may not be chestnut. The head is light with a straight profile. The chest is wide and muscular.

References

Horse breeds
Horse breeds originating in Italy